Notre-Dame-de-Courson is a former commune in the department of Calvados in the Normandy region in northwestern France. On 1 January 2016, it was merged into the new commune of Livarot-Pays-d'Auge.

History
Notre-Dame-de-Courson fell in medieval times within the barony of the Ferrers family at nearby Ferrières-Saint-Hilaire, who took part of the Norman Conquest of England. One branch of the Curzons from Notre-Dame-de-Courson accompanied their Ferrers overlord to England.

Population

International relations
Notre-Dame-de-Courson is twinned with the village of Sampford Peverell in Devon, England.

See also
Communes of the Calvados department

References

Former communes of Calvados (department)
Calvados communes articles needing translation from French Wikipedia